Counties 5 Surrey is a rugby union competition covering the English county of Surrey and parts of south-west London. It sits at the bottom of English Rugby union system, at level 11, making it the lowest level competition still controlled by the Rugby Football Union (RFU). The winner of the league is promoted for the following season to Counties 4 Surrey. There is no relegation from the league, and no promotion into it, however new teams can apply to join.    

The league was first formed in the 1989-90 season and ran for three years before its closure at the end of the 1991-1992 season. When the league was disbanded, teams were either automatically promoted to Surrey 4, moved to other leagues, or folded. 

As part of a larger restructuring of the entire English rugby union pyramid, undertaken by the RFU, the league was re-formed. Beginning with the 2022-23 season, nine teams from Surrey and south-west London compete in the division.

Current teams 
The 9 teams currently playing in the division are:

 Egham Hollowegians
 Haslemere
 Merton
 Mitcham & Carshalton
 Old Hamptonians
 Raynes Park
 Reigate
 Wandsworthians
 Woking

Original teams
When the competition began in 1989, the following teams played in the division:

Economicals - relegated from Surrey 4
Gibraltar Engineers - new to league
Haslemere - relegated from Surrey 3
Lightwater - relegated from Surrey 3
Oxted - relegated from Surrey 3
Racal-Decca - relegated from Surrey 3
Woking - new to league

Surrey 5 honours

Number of league titles

 Gibraltar Engineers (1)
 Woking (1)
 Kew Occasionals (1)

See also
London & SE Division RFU
Surrey RFU
English rugby union system
Rugby union in England

References

External links
Surrey Rugby Football Union
RFU Table for Counties Surrey 5

11
Rugby union in Surrey
Sports leagues established in 1989
Sports leagues disestablished in 1992
Sports leagues established in 2022